Boondall railway station is located on the Shorncliffe line in Queensland, Australia. It is one of two stations serving the Brisbane suburb of Boondall, the other being North Boondall station. The station is within walking distance of the Brisbane Entertainment Centre.

Services
Boondall station is served by all stops Shorncliffe line services from Shorncliffe to Roma Street, Cannon Hill, Manly and Cleveland.

Services by platform

References

External links

Boondall station Queensland Rail
Boondall station Queensland's Railways on the Internet
[ Boondall station] TransLink travel information

Railway stations in Brisbane
Boondall, Queensland